Pinet is a dam and hydroelectric power station on the River Tarn in Saint-Victor-et-Melvieu in Aveyron, southern France.

The dam was built in 1932, and the station has five Francis turbines generating 42.5MW.

Description

The dam
The dam constructed in 1929 was regulated by 18 groups of sluices. These were replaced by three rising barriers,  in dimension.

The lake

The turbine hall
It contains five Francis turbines which generate .

See also

Le Pouget (power station)
La Jourdanie (power station)
Renewable energy in France

References

External links

 Hydroweb Pouget 

Dams completed in 1932
Energy infrastructure completed in 1932
Buildings and structures in Aveyron
Hydroelectric power stations in France
Dams in France
Run-of-the-river power stations
20th-century architecture in France